Meems Bottom Covered Bridge (also Meem's Bottom Covered Bridge) is a covered bridge in Shenandoah County, Virginia, United States. Near the town of Mount Jackson, the Meems Bottom Covered Bridge features a 200-foot single-span wooden Burr arch structure. Built in 1892 by Franklin Hiser Wissler, the wooden bridge over the North Fork of the Shenandoah River provided access to his apple orchards at Strathmore Farms. The bridge was listed on the National Register of Historic Places on June 10, 1975.

History
It is believed that there were at least two prior bridges near Meem's Bottom that were lost by flood and fire. The first bridge was likely burned in 1862 by Stonewall Jackson's Rebels, and the second, washed away by floodwaters in 1870. There were likely also other bridges called Meems Bottom Bridge from Meem's bottomland, an alluvial plain formed by the North Fork of the Shenandoah, across the river to Mt. Jackson.

In a pre-dawn raid on October 3, 1864, Confederate Captain John McNeill led anywhere from 30 to 60 Confederate rangers (sources vary as to the number) against roughly 100 Union troopers of the 8th Ohio Cavalry Regiment guarding Meems Bottom, the bridge to Mt. Jackson, a strategic crossing on the Valley Turnpike. The attack lasted just fifteen minutes with most of the Union cavalry captured but McNeill, one of the best-known Confederate partisan raiders, was mortally wounded. He was taken to the house on Rude's Hill, where his identity was discovered by Union General Sheridan. He was then moved to Harrisonburg where he died.

The current Meems Bottom Covered Bridge is the fourth formally recorded bridge across the North Fork of the Shenandoah River at the location.  The first bridge was constructed between 1867 and 1868, and was subsequently destroyed by a flood in March 1870.  The bridge was replaced by 1871; however, this bridge was destroyed by floodwaters in November 1877.  The third bridge was constructed in 1878 and was replaced by the current structure in 1894.  Another, earlier bridge at a nearby location was destroyed by General Stonewall Jackson's troops in 1862 during the American Civil War.

The name of the bridge derives from the locally prominent Meem family, which held large tracts of land in the area.   The timbers that were used to build the bridge of 1894 were cut from Confederate General Gilbert S. Meem's former farm, Strathmoor, located nearby. The farm was bought by F. H. Whisler in 1891; he contracted John Woods to construct the 1894 bridge.  Some  of timber were cut locally by J. L. Olinger.

The current bridge is of the Burr Truss design, which was patented by Theodore Burr, brother of U.S. Vice President Aaron Burr, in 1817. Two stone abutments, which extend ten feet below the riverbed, support the bridge on the sides of the river. The rock used in the abutments was gathered from local quarries. The bridge was strengthened in 1937 with the addition of steel I-beams running along the length of the bridge and parallel to the roadway supports. A new road surface was also added at this time.

The bridge continued to serve traffic until it was destroyed by fire when vandals burned the bridge on October 31, 1976.  The original timbers of the bridge were salvaged, however, and the bridge was reconstructed and put back into service by September 1979.  The restoration included new concrete piers and steel beams.

Meems Bottom Covered Bridge was added to the National Register of Historic Places on June 10, 1975.  An updated listing was added on April 23, 2008.  The bridge is also on the Virginia Landmarks Register and was listed on April 15, 1975.  The updated listing was added March 10, 2008.

See also
 List of bridges on the National Register of Historic Places in Virginia
 List of covered bridges in Virginia
 National Register of Historic Places listings in Shenandoah County, Virginia
14th PA Cavalry, in addition to 8th Ohio, were part of the raid in October 1864.

Footnotes

References

External links

National Register Nomination:  Meems Bottom Covered Bridge, Shenandoah County: Photo from the Virginia Department of Historic Resources

Covered bridges on the National Register of Historic Places in Virginia
Bridges completed in 1894
Buildings and structures in Shenandoah County, Virginia
National Register of Historic Places in Shenandoah County, Virginia
Bridges completed in 1979
Road bridges on the National Register of Historic Places in Virginia
Wooden bridges in Virginia
Burr Truss bridges in the United States
Covered bridges in the United States destroyed by arson
Mount Jackson, Virginia